The Golden Raspberry Awards (also known as the Razzies and Razzie Awards) is a parody award show honoring the worst of cinematic “failures.” Co-founded by UCLA film graduates and film industry veterans John J. B. Wilson and Mo Murphy, the Razzie Awards' satirical annual ceremony has preceded its opposite, the Academy Awards, for four decades. The term raspberry is used in its irreverent sense, as in "blowing a raspberry". The statuette itself is a golf ball-sized raspberry atop a Super 8mm film reel spray-painted gold, with an estimated street value of $4.97. The Golden Raspberry Foundation has claimed that the award "encourages well-known filmmakers and top notch performers to own their bad."

The first Golden Raspberry Awards ceremony was held on March 31, 1981, in John J. B. Wilson's living-room alcove in Hollywood, to honor the perceived worst films of the 1980 film season. To date, Sylvester Stallone is the most awarded actor ever with 10 awards.

History

American publicist John J. B. Wilson had been seeing a 99-cent double feature of Can't Stop the Music and Xanadu and thought in his drive home that those movies deserved awards for their low quality, and subsequently started thinking of all the other films that disappointed him in 1980, particularly as he had watched hundreds of productions in his job making trailers. So, the following year, in the potluck parties he usually held at his home in Hollywood on the night of the Academy Awards, after the 53rd Academy Awards had completed for the evening, Wilson passed ballots regarding the worst in film to the attendees, and invited his friends to give random award presentations in his living room. Wilson stood at a lectern made of cardboard in a tacky tuxedo, with a foam ball attached to a broomstick as a fake microphone, and announced Can't Stop the Music as the first Golden Raspberry Award Winner for Worst Picture. The impromptu ceremony was a success and the following week a press release about his event was picked up by a few local newspapers, including a mention in the Los Angeles Daily News with the headline: "Take These Envelopes, Please".

Approximately three dozen people came to the 1st Golden Raspberry Awards. The 2nd Golden Raspberry Awards had double the attendance, and the 3rd awards ceremony had doubled that number. By the 4th Golden Raspberry Awards ceremony, CNN and two major wire services covered the event. Wilson realized that by scheduling the Golden Raspberry Awards prior to the Academy Awards, the ceremony would get more press coverage: "We finally figured out you couldn't compete with the Oscars on Oscar night, but if you went the night before, when the press from all over the world are here and they are looking for something to do, it could well catch on," he said to BBC News.

In 2022, a dedicated award category, Worst Bruce Willis Performance in a 2021 Movie, was created after Bruce Willis starred in a number of poorly received low-budget films. On March 30 of that year, Willis's family announced that he had been diagnosed with aphasia, a disorder that damages the area of the brain that controls language expression and comprehension. The Golden Raspberry Awards subsequently retracted the award category, saying it was inappropriate to award a Golden Raspberry to someone whose performance was affected by a medical condition. At the same time, the Awards retroactively retracted their 1980 Worst Actress nomination of Shelley Duvall in The Shining, stating "We have since discovered that Duvall's performance was impacted by Stanley Kubrick's treatment of her throughout the production". In 2023, following backlash for nominating 12-year-old Ryan Kiera Armstrong for Worst Actress, the Golden Raspberry Awards rescinded the nomination and said individuals under age 18 would no longer be nominated.

Format
Members of the Golden Raspberry Award Organization pay for membership, and number 650 from 19 countries. After three editions held during Wilson's potluck Oscar parties, Wilson realized that by scheduling the Golden Raspberry Awards prior to the Academy Awards, the ceremony would get more press coverage, and the fourth edition happened at Los Angeles' Third Street Elementary School. The ceremonies have kept this scheduling with both nominations and awards revealed in the day before the Academy Awards, with only two exceptions ever since, that only used the day before the Oscars to reveal the nominees: 2012's 32nd Golden Raspberry Awards, where the ceremony happened on April 1 for being April Fool's Day; and 2020, where the plans for the milestone 40th Golden Raspberry Awards was a bigger, televised ceremony in March, which wound up cancelled due to the COVID-19 pandemic and just had the winners revealed online.

Recipients who have accepted their award

Paul Verhoeven was the first person to go to the ceremony to receive his awards for the movie Showgirls. Other recipients who have accepted their Golden Raspberry Award include Tom Green (Worst Actor/Worst Director), Halle Berry and Sandra Bullock (Worst Actress), Michael Ferris and J. D. Shapiro (Worst Screenplay), eight-time Oscar winner Alan Menken, Dinesh D'Souza, Fifty Shades of Grey producers Dana Brunetti and Michael De Luca.

Contenders for worst and best
Several people have received Razzie nominations while simultaneously receiving award nominations from other organizations, sometimes for the same work or role.

Razzie and Oscar
Three people have won both a Razzie and an Oscar the same weekend: composer Alan Menken in 1993, screenwriter Brian Helgeland in 1997, and actress Sandra Bullock in 2010, though all three won for different films (for example, Helgeland won a Razzie for The Postman and an Oscar for L.A. Confidential). Three actors have received Oscar and Razzie acting nominations for the same role: James Coco (Only When I Laugh), Amy Irving (Yentl), and Glenn Close (Hillbilly Elegy). The Aerosmith song "I Don't Want to Miss a Thing" from Armageddon was nominated for both an Academy Award for Best Original Song and a Golden Raspberry Award for Worst Original Song, as were the Trisha Yearwood song "How Do I Live" from the 1997 film Con Air and the Tony Bennett song "Life in a Looking Glass" from the 1986 film That's Life!.

Gena Rowlands was nominated for the Academy Award for Best Actress for her role in the 1980 John Cassavetes film Gloria while her co-star John Adames won the Worst Supporting Actor alongside co-winner Laurence Olivier in The Jazz Singer (1980).

Wall Street (1987) is the only film to win both an Oscar and a Razzie. Michael Douglas won the Academy Award for Best Actor, while Daryl Hannah's performance won the Razzie for Worst Supporting Actress.

In 2013, Disney's The Lone Ranger won one Razzie (Worst Remake) of its five nominations, and was also nominated for two Oscars (for Best Makeup and Hairstyling and Best Visual Effects).

The 1983 romance/dance film Flashdance was nominated for the Razzie Award for Worst Screenplay and won an Oscar for Best Original Song for Irene Cara's "Flashdance... What a Feeling".

While 1992's The Bodyguard was a critical failure (earning seven Razzie nominations), it was a huge box office hit and, moreover, its multi-platinum soundtrack album earned two nominations for Best Original Song.

Joker (2019) was the most nominated film at the 92nd Academy Awards, with 11 nominations including the Best Picture, and won two including the Best Actor. However, the film's polarized critical reception resulted in it earning a nomination in the special Razzie category of Worst Reckless Disregard for Human Life and Public Property, which it lost to Rambo: Last Blood. This nomination also made Joker the second film to be nominated for the Academy Award for Best Picture and a Razzie, after 1990's The Godfather Part III. At the 2022 ceremony, Elvis became the third film nominated for Best Picture to be nominated for a Razzie, receiving two nominations for Worst Supporting Actor for Tom Hanks and Worst Screen Combo for Hanks and "his latex-laden face (and ludicrous accent)."

Borat Subsequent Moviefilm was nominated for Best Adapted Screenplay and Best Supporting Actress for Maria Bakalova at the 93rd Academy Awards in the same year it won for Worst Supporting Actor for Rudy Giuliani and Worst Screen Combo for Giuliani and Bakalova (later changed to Giuliani and "his pants zipper").

Blonde was nominated for eight Razzies at the 2022 ceremony, including Worst Screen Combo for "Both real life characters in the fallacious White House bedroom scene," referring to Marilyn Monroe and John F. Kennedy, played by Ana de Armas and Caspar Phillipson respectively.   However, de Armas was also nominated for the Academy Award for Best Actress and Golden Globe Award for Best Actress in a Motion Picture – Drama for her performance in Blonde.  This made Blonde the first Razzie nominee for Worst Picture to receive an acting nomination at the Academy Awards.

Razzie and Annie Award
In spite of the heavily negative critical consensus (winning only one of its six nominations), the 2012 action film Battleship was also nominated for an Annie Award for Best Animated Effects in a Live Action Production.

Despite receiving the Golden Raspberry Award for Worst Supporting Actor for his portrayal of Jar Jar Binks in Star Wars Episode I: The Phantom Menace, voice actor Ahmed Best won an Annie Award in 2009 for the portrayal of the same character in the animated TV episode Robot Chicken: Star Wars Episode II.

Razzie and Golden Globe
Neil Diamond, winner of the inaugural Worst Actor Razzie for 1980's The Jazz Singer, was nominated for the Golden Globe in the same role.

Pia Zadora won both Worst Actress and Worst New Star in 1982 for her role in Butterfly, but also won Best Female Newcomer in the same year and in the same role. This Golden Globe was in contentious circumstances as her husband, Israeli multimillionaire Meshulam Riklis, flew Hollywood Foreign Press Association members to Las Vegas in order to hear Zadora sing. Also in Butterfly, Orson Welles was nominated for both Best Supporting Actor and Worst Supporting Actor in his role.

1988's Cocktail won two of its four nominations for Worst Picture and Worst Screenplay, but the Beach Boys' song "Kokomo" was also nominated for a Golden Globe for Best Original Song.

Despite being a major critical and commercial failure, and only receiving the most awards and nominations (including Worst Picture and Worst Director (Tom Hooper)), the 2019 film Cats was also nominated for a Golden Globe for Best Original Song for Taylor Swift's song "Beautiful Ghosts".

The Sia-directed autism musical Music, nominated for four Razzies, was also nominated for two Golden Globes: Best Actress (Kate Hudson, who won a Razzie) and Best Picture, both for Musical or Comedy.

As mentioned in the "Razzie and Oscar" section above, Ana de Armas was nominated for Worst Screen Combo at the 2022 ceremony for her role in Blonde alongside Caspar Phillipson, but she was also nominated for the Golden Globe Award for Best Actress in a Motion Picture – Drama for that same role.

Razzie and Grammy
Various songs received wins/nominations for both the Razzie and the Grammy Awards, such as Madonna's "Die Another Day" (Best Dance Recording), Will Smith's "Wild Wild West" (Best Rap Solo Performance), Britney Spears' "Overprotected" (Best Female Pop Vocal Performance), U2's "Hold Me, Thrill Me, Kiss Me, Kill Me" (Best Rock Performance by a Duo or Group with Vocal), The Smashing Pumpkins' "The End Is the Beginning Is the End" (Best Hard Rock Performance), and LeAnn Rimes' "How Do I Live" (Best Female Country Vocal Performance).

Razzie and Tony 
Newsies was nominated for Worst Picture at the 1993 ceremony, and Alan Menken won Worst Original Song for "High Times, Hard Times". The 2011 stage adaptation, which did not include "High Times, Hard Times", was nominated for the Tony Award for Best Musical, and Menken won Best Original Score.

Ben Platt won a Tony for Best Actor in a Musical playing the titular character in Dear Evan Hansen in 2017 and received a Razzie nomination for Worst Actor for the same role for the 2021 film adaptation.

Razzie and Saturn Award
In 1981, Stanley Kubrick was nominated both for a Razzie Award as Worst Director at the 1st Golden Raspberry Awards as well as for a Saturn Award for Best Director at the 8th Saturn Awards for the same film: The Shining. In 2002, Natalie Portman was nominated for Worst Supporting Actress and for the Saturn Award for Best Actress for the same role in Star Wars: Episode II – Attack of the Clones. Cassandra Peterson was nominated for Worst Actress at the 9th Golden Raspberry Awards and for Best Actress at the 16th Saturn Awards for her role as Elvira in the 1988 film Elvira: Mistress of the Dark.

In 2001, whilst Tim Burton's Planet of the Apes garnered all three Razzies it was nominated for, Rick Baker's makeup designs were very well received, that it earned him a Saturn Award nomination for Best Makeup, while Helena Bonham Carter, Tim Roth and Colleen Atwood were respectively nominated for Best Supporting Actress, Best Supporting Actor, and Best Costume.

The 1997 apocalyptic film The Postman "received" all five awards, but also three Saturn nominations.

Quentin Tarantino was nominated for Worst Supporting Actor in 1996 for his role in From Dusk till Dawn. The previous year, he had been nominated for Best Supporting Actor for the very same role.

Razzie and Young Artist Award
Heavily panned comedy film Blended only earned three Razzie nominations: Worst Actor (Adam Sandler), Worst Actress (Drew Barrymore) and Worst Supporting Actor (Shaquille O'Neal), but also two Young Artist Award nominations, winning one for Best Performance in a Feature Film – Young Ensemble Cast.

Although M. Night Shyamalan's The Last Airbender "won" Worst Picture of 2010, it did, however, receive two Young Artist Award nominations: Best Performance in a Feature Film - Leading Young Actor (Noah Ringer) and Best Performance in a Feature Film - Supporting Young Actress (Seychelle Gabriel), respectively losing both to Jaden Smith, Diandra Newlin, and Stefanie Scott for The Karate Kid, Dreamkiller, and Flipped.

Razzie and international awards
In 1985, Michael Cimino's Year of the Dragon, which was nominated for five Razzie Awards (including Worst Picture) at the 6th Golden Raspberry Awards, was also nominated for the César Award for Best Foreign Film (César du meilleur film étranger) and was listed by the prestigious French magazine Cahiers du Cinéma as the third best film of 1985.

In 2017, Darren Aronofsky, director of Mother!, was nominated for both the Worst Director Razzie at the 38th Golden Raspberry Awards and the Golden Lion (the highest award offered at the Venice Film Festival) at the 74th Venice International Film Festival.

In 2018, the mystery comedy Holmes & Watson won four of its six nominations (including Worst Picture and Worst Director (Etan Cohen)) at the 39th Golden Raspberry Awards, but was also nominated for two ALFS Awards (including British Actor (Steve Coogan) and Young British Performer (Noah Jupe)).

Despite Johnny Depp receiving two Razzie nominations for his performance in the film, Emily Blunt received an ALFS Award nomination for her performance in the CGI-animated box office hit Sherlock Gnomes. She also received nominations for her parts in the critically acclaimed movies A Quiet Place and Mary Poppins Returns.

While M. Night Shyamalan's After Earth tied Movie 43 for the most awards with three, it also brought its composer James Newton Howard a World Soundtrack Award nomination for Film Composer of the Year.

Categories
Current Awards
Worst Picture: 1980 to present
Worst Director: 1980 to present
Worst Actor: 1980 to present
Worst Actress: 1980 to present
Worst Supporting Actor: 1980 to present
Worst Supporting Actress: 1980 to present
Worst Screenplay: 1980 to present
Worst Prequel, Remake, Rip-off or Sequel: 1994 to present, except 1996 and 1999
Worst Screen Combo: 2013 to present
Razzie Redeemer Award: 2014 to present

Retired
Worst Original Song: 1980 to 1999, 2002
Worst New Star: 1981 to 1998, except 1989
Worst Musical Score: 1981 to 1985
Worst Visual Effects: 1986 to 1987
Worst Screen Couple: 1994 to 2009, 2011 to 2012
Worst Screen Couple/Worst Screen Ensemble: 2010
Worst Screen Ensemble: 2011 to 2012

Special categories
Special categories have also been introduced for specific years. Such special awards include:

Anniversary awards
Every decade-closing ceremony includes an award for the worst actors and movies of the decade—though the 2000 ceremony put the actors as worst of the 20th century instead. Special prizes for the 25th anniversary of the Razzies awards were also given out in 2005.

Other types of awards

Razzie Redeemer Award
The Razzie Redeemer Award is presented to a former nominee or winner who has subsequently made a comeback from critical or commercial failure. The award was introduced in 2014. Winners include Ben Affleck, Sylvester Stallone, Mel Gibson, "A Safe Hollywood-Haven", Melissa McCarthy, Eddie Murphy, Will Smith, and Colin Farrell.

Worst Career Achievement
This award has been given five times, to Ronald Reagan in 1981, to Linda Blair in 1983, to Irwin Allen in 1985, to "Bruce the Rubber Shark" from Jaws in 1987, and to director Uwe Boll in 2009 who received this for his achievement as "Germany's answer to Ed Wood".

Governor's Award
This is a special award given by Razzie Award Governor John J. B. Wilson to an individual whose achievements are not covered by the Razzies' other categories. It was awarded in 2003 to Travis Payne for "Distinguished Under-Achievement in Choreography" in the film From Justin to Kelly.

Barry L. Bumstead Award
This award is given to a critical and financial failure that would have been nominated if it had received an eligible release. It was awarded in 2015 to United Passions, to Misconduct in 2016, in 2017 to CHiPs and in 2018 to Billionaire Boys Club.

Ceremonies

1980: 1st Golden Raspberry Awards
1981: 2nd Golden Raspberry Awards
1982: 3rd Golden Raspberry Awards
1983: 4th Golden Raspberry Awards
1984: 5th Golden Raspberry Awards
1985: 6th Golden Raspberry Awards
1986: 7th Golden Raspberry Awards
1987: 8th Golden Raspberry Awards
1988: 9th Golden Raspberry Awards
1989: 10th Golden Raspberry Awards
1990: 11th Golden Raspberry Awards
1991: 12th Golden Raspberry Awards
1992: 13th Golden Raspberry Awards
1993: 14th Golden Raspberry Awards
1994: 15th Golden Raspberry Awards
1995: 16th Golden Raspberry Awards
1996: 17th Golden Raspberry Awards
1997: 18th Golden Raspberry Awards
1998: 19th Golden Raspberry Awards
1999: 20th Golden Raspberry Awards
2000: 21st Golden Raspberry Awards
2001: 22nd Golden Raspberry Awards
2002: 23rd Golden Raspberry Awards
2003: 24th Golden Raspberry Awards
2004: 25th Golden Raspberry Awards
2005: 26th Golden Raspberry Awards
2006: 27th Golden Raspberry Awards
2007: 28th Golden Raspberry Awards
2008: 29th Golden Raspberry Awards
2009: 30th Golden Raspberry Awards
2010: 31st Golden Raspberry Awards
2011: 32nd Golden Raspberry Awards
2012: 33rd Golden Raspberry Awards
2013: 34th Golden Raspberry Awards
2014: 35th Golden Raspberry Awards
2015: 36th Golden Raspberry Awards
2016: 37th Golden Raspberry Awards
2017: 38th Golden Raspberry Awards
2018: 39th Golden Raspberry Awards
2019: 40th Golden Raspberry Awards
2020: 41st Golden Raspberry Awards
2021: 42nd Golden Raspberry Awards
2022: 43rd Golden Raspberry Awards

Criticism
The Razzies have received criticism, including from news sources such as IndieWire  and The Daily Telegraph, for several issues, including that members of the Golden Raspberry Foundation are not required to watch the nominated films, it follows a different set of rules which is different from the invitation-only Academy of Motion Picture Arts and Sciences. Critics take issue with the Razzies picking "easy targets" and critically panned mainstream films instead of those perceived as less popular but more deserving productions, continuing to appeal to celebrities, seemingly for publicity and attention, over other, worthier films and performances.

Sam Adams of IndieWire has said the Razzies are "like hecklers hurling insults at comedians or a concertgoer yelling out 'Whoo!' during a quiet song, they're not-so-secretly crying out to be noticed. The Razzies, properly enough, avoid pouncing on the little guy; they don't trash no-budget indies no one has seen for having bad lighting or terrible sound". Robbie Collin of The Daily Telegraph has said, "the Razzies' ongoing failure to train its sights on anything but the most obvious targets means it grows more tired and redundant by the year". CraveOnline's William Bibbiani stated that the Razzies follow "a cheap shot of pranksterism", and "with only a handful of exceptions, the Razzies have only seen fit to nominate the most infamous movies of the year, and not necessarily the worst." In 2018, Scott Meslow, writing for GQ, accused the Razzies of being "pretty lazy, very sexist, and a little racist" in their choices, reiterating criticism that voters were overreliant on films already widely perceived as notorious, and further asserting they disproportionally nominated films directed by and starring Tyler Perry and films marketed towards women.

In 2021, Liam Gaughan of the Dallas Observer wrote, "It’s easy to find fault in any awards nominations, be it Oscars or Razzies, but the greater issue that the Razzies face is that making fun of bad movies is no longer original. Film criticism, essays and satire all live in abundance on the internet, from both established publications and non-professionals." Daniel Cook Johnson of MovieWeb echoed a similar sentiment, writing, "Wilson and Murphy’s insulting event may have been a wonderfully snarky and skewering enterprise back in the ‘80s when there was much less film criticism and audience reactions to recent movies. But now, there’s little reason for such an invalid vehicle, and the retirement option should be recognized before their relevance and shaky reputation are completely gone."

The Razzies have also seen significant criticism from both within the industry and its own voting body for including underage actors in their ballots and nominations, with many noting the outcome of their careers and later personal and legal issues. Among those who were nominated or won include Gary Coleman (at age 14) for On the Right Track in 1982, Macaulay Culkin (at age 14) for Getting Even With Dad, The Pagemaster, and Richie Rich in 1995, Jake Lloyd (at age 11) for Star Wars: Episode I - The Phantom Menace, Jaden Smith (age 15) for After Earth ("winner"), Ryan Kiera Armstrong (at age 12) for Firestarter. Maddie Ziegler, though 18 years old when nominated, "won" Worst Supporting Actress for Music, released in 2021, for a role she played at 14 years old during filming in 2017. In 2023, the Razzies announced they would no longer nominate individuals under age 18.

See also

 Academy Awards
 Stinkers Bad Movie Awards
 The Golden Turkey Awards
 Golden Kela Awards
 List of films considered the worst
 List of people who have accepted Golden Raspberry Awards

Notes

References

External links

 
 Razzie Awards page on the Internet Movie Database
 Razzie channel on YouTube
 All Time Razzie Champions List

 
American film awards
Lists of worsts
Awards established in 1981
Ironic and humorous awards
Award ceremonies